Celleporina is a genus of bryozoans belonging to the family Celleporidae.

The genus has almost cosmopolitan distribution.

Species:

Celleporina abstrusa 
Celleporina algarvensis 
Celleporina antiqua

References

Bryozoan genera